Timas Publishing Group (Turkish: Timaş Yayınları) is a publishing group based in Istanbul, Turkey. It includes several publishers: Sufi Book, Leyla and Mecnun Publishing (L&M), Carpe Diem Publishing and Antik Classics. It is a member of the Turkish Publishers Association.

References

External links
 Timaş Yayınları web site

Book publishing companies of Turkey
Publishing companies established in 1982
Turkish companies established in 1982